The Pacific Northwest Senior PGA Championship, also known as the PNW Senior PGA Championship, is a golf championship for senior players held annually, usually in September in the Pacific Northwest. It is affiliated with the PGA of America. The Senior PGA Professional Championship was established in 1952, although a Pacific Northwest Senior Golf Championship had existed long before then at an amateur level and was even won by a former tennis star Bernie Schwengers in 1943. In the 1960s, it was held for years at the Yakima Elks' Golf and Country Club between 21 players with prize money of just $920.

Winners

2017 Steve Stull
2016 Rob Gibbons
2015 George Mack Jr.
2014 Steve Stull
2013 Jeff Coston
2012 Chuck Milne
2011 Jeff Coston
2010 Jeff Coston
2009 Jeff Coston
2008 Jeff Coston
2007 Jeff Coston
2006 Jeff Coston
2005 Fred Haney
2004 Don Bies
2003 Ed Fisher
2002 Fred Haney
2001 Jerry Lee
2000 Chuck Milne
1999 Michael Kahler
1998 Elwin Fanning
1997 Jim Wilkinson
1996 Bill Tindall
1995 Jim Wilkinson
1994 Ted Naff
1993 Gerry Mehlert
1992 Gerry Mehlert
1991 Tim Berg
1990 Lloyd Harris
1989 Ted Naff
1988 Tim Berg
1987 Jim Shriver
1986 Billy Derickson
1985 Ray Bennett
1984 Geo Lanning
1983 Geo Lanning
1982 Bob Duden
1981 Harvey Hixson
1980 Don Kirkpatrick
1979 Bob Duden
1978 Bob Duden
1977 Ernie Luckenotte
1976 Bob Duden
1975 Bob Duden
1974 Al Williams
1973 Bob Duden
1972 Bud Hofmeister
1971 Bob Duden
1970 Bill Isbill

References

Senior golf tournaments
Recurring sporting events established in 1970